Humanity First is an international charity that provides disaster relief and long term development assistance to vulnerable communities in 52 countries across 6 continents. The organisation is run by volunteers with diverse skillsets across the world and has access to thousands of extra volunteers worldwide. Volunteer staff in all areas (operations, expert medics, engineers and teachers) often pay their own expenses to support the international projects.

The organisation differentiates itself in the aid industry with a high level of efficiency. Extensive use of volunteers, partnerships and global sourcing result in high levels of funds going straight to projects. Similarly, the value of the aid delivered (projects as well as free man-hours of doctors, engineers and teachers) is greater than the value of donations received. Uniquely, volunteer staff often pay their own international expenses.

As immediate disaster responses conclude, the charity also often begins rehabilitation services through orphan care, water infrastructure and vocational training.

The organisation gained Special Consultative Status with the United Nations Economic and Social Council.

Objectives
The charity is based upon the preservation of human life and dignity. Its objectives are to:
 Relieve suffering caused by natural disasters or man-made conflicts
 Promote peace and understanding based upon mutual tolerance and respect
 Strengthen people's capacity to help themselves

1994 Origins 
The concept of Humanity First originates from a desire to provide aid on the basis of need alone, irrespective of race, religion, colour or political allegiance. The organization was established in London, UK, and registered in 1994 by then worldwide head of the Ahmadiyya Muslim Community, Mirza Tahir Ahmad. Ahmadiyya is a global reform movement within Islam, with 20 million followers, one of its objectives is "establishing peace at all levels of society and to protect the basic human rights of all people".

Growth and Present Situation 
Humanity First grew into a multi-national aid agency and non-profit charitable organization, often working with other agencies such as the Red Cross, Oxfam, and Save the Children. The organization has access to thousands of volunteers across the globe. Humanity First today has Special Consultative Status with the Economic and Social Council of the United Nations.

Two Areas of Focus  
The organization splits its work into two areas; 
Disaster Relief
Human Development (long-term sustainable projects)

Disaster Relief 
Disaster relief covers the provision of humanitarian aid, medical relief, shelter, food and safe water in response to both man-made and natural disasters. Examples in the last 10 years include responses to the following: Kobe earthquake in Japan, Kosovo War, 1999 İzmit earthquake in Turkey, 2004 Indian Ocean earthquake and tsunami in Indonesia and Sri Lanka, Hurricane Katrina, and the 2005 Kashmir earthquake in Pakistan. More recently, they have responded to catastrophic flooding in Suriname, Guyana and Kenya, the 2010 Haiti earthquake, the 2011 Japan earthquake and tsunami and the 2017 Grenfell Tower fire in London, UK.

Table of Disaster Relief Work (Non-Exhaustive) 
The table below illustrates disasters that HF have been involved in and level of assistance they have provided to local victims:

List updated in 2014 expect for Syrian Civil War, Rohingya crisis and Grenfell Tower additions.

Human Development 
Humanity First approaches its human development projects with long term sustainability as a priority. The projects are rooted in a community deeply affected by a natural disaster, war, or poverty. After the relief phase of the project has subsided, Humanity First works with the community to identify viable opportunities for growth and recovery.

Human development programs can be categorized under the categories of: 1) Health & Medical Programs, or 2) Educational & Vocational Programs. Health & Medical: Designed to provide much needed health and medical services and supplies to some of the world's most vulnerable populations. Educational & Vocational Programs: Designed to help create capacity and self-sufficiency through providing support for primary education for children and vocational training for adults in various under-privileged communities around the world

The organisation splits its long-term work into seven programmes:

Food Security
Knowledge for Life
Orphan Care
Knowledge for Life
Water for Life
Global Health
Gift of Sight

Examples of Long-term Project Work
Humanity First runs a number of long-term projects largely in Africa and Asia:

 Food Security - 'Feed a Family' - provision of basic necessities to deserving and vulnerable families, normally for a fixed period of 6 months. Over 700 Tonnes of food and aid has been shipped to Africa for poor families. HF is now establishing a Feed a Village program; it has also established a Feed the Homeless program in the heart of Montreal.
 Knowledge for Life - 'Learn a Skill' - The purpose of Learn a Skill programme is to strengthen people's capacity to help themselves. So far the programme has been providing assistance on the ground through the following projects: IT Centres, Sewing / Tailoring Centres, Construction Trades and Management skills. As of 2013, Humanity First was running over 30 training centres in 16 countries with 39,347 student recipients. 
 Humanity First Ahmadiyya Vocational College (HFAVC) is established in 2010 in Monrovia Liberia by Humanity First USA. Currently it offers 10 vocational trades with dedicated workshops to train hands on. It is first of its kind institution in Liberia which offers scholarships and other facilities to students. Masroor Agriculture and Technical Institute (MATI) is a new vocational college in Liberia established in 2013 and will start working early 2014. Humanity First Liberia website and its projects are funded by Humanity First USA.
 Orphan Care - running and support of orphanages covering the needs of orphans including accommodation, education, food, clothing and health. Orphan programmes are currently running in Gambia, Pakistan, Sierra Leone, Indonesia, Burkina Faso and Benin.
 Water for Life - set up or repair of water pumps to provide clean and safe drinking water to remote villages in underdeveloped regions. Humanity First are working on these projects with Water Aid and IAAAE and have built or refurbished over 420 pumps and filter units in West Africa, Latin America and Asia.
 Gift of Sight - work with a network of hospitals to provide sight treatment ranging from glasses, treatment of infections and in extreme cases, operations to rectify cataracts.  Humanity First USA sent a team of eye doctors and volunteers to San Juan Sacatapequez, Guatemala in 2010 to conduct a successful cataract surgery camp.  The 2nd mission took place in October 2011 in Chichicastenango, Guatemala.  Over 30 cataract surgeries were performed and 125 patients were examined and given donated spectacles.  The Gift of Sight program plans annual trips to underserved nations worldwide to provide free eye care and train local doctors for sustained care.

Spending 
The organisation is known for its high level of efficiency. Extensive use of volunteers, partnerships and global sourcing result in high levels of funds going straight to projects. Similarly, the value of the aid delivered (projects as well as free man-hours of doctors, engineers and teachers) is greater than the value of donations received. Uniquely, volunteer staff often pay their own international expenses.

Spending is subdivided from the organisation's two areas - long-term work in human development and short-term disaster relief. Volunteer staff in all areas (operations, expert medics, engineers and teachers) often pay their own expenses to support the international projects.

References

New IT Centre in Guyana
US Affiliation & Registration
UK School Donor to HF
Sierra Leone youth affiliation
US Charity Directory listing
German Wikipedia entry
Haiti team from HF UK
Haiti team from HF Canada

External links 
 Official website
 Official UK website

Charities based in London
Development charities based in the United Kingdom
International charities
International organisations based in London